The Dutch Tweede Divisie in the 1961–1962 season was contested by 15 teams. This was the last season the teams would play in a single division. Due to a realignment in the Eerste Divisie, the Tweede Divisie would be expanded from one group to two, while the Eerste Divisie would become one league instead of two, meaning many teams would be relegated to this league next season.

Since it seemed necessary that some teams would have to be relegated to amateur football, play-offs for the 9th and 12th place were played. However, eventually only the last place finisher was actually relegated, as two teams from the Eerste Divisie moved straight to the amateurs.

New entrants
Relegated from the Eerste Divisie
 HFC EDO
 Helmondia '55
 Racing Club Heemstede

League standings

However, no one was relegated as a result of thes.

However, Zwolsche Boys were not relegated as a result of this.

See also
 1961–62 Eredivisie
 1961–62 Eerste Divisie

References
Netherlands - List of final tables (RSSSF)

Tweede Divisie seasons
3
Neth